List of English and British monarchs may refer to:

 List of English monarchs (927–1707)
 List of British monarchs (1707–present)